Austfjorden is a fjord in Spitsbergen, Svalbard in Arctic Norway. The fjord (East Fjord), measuring 32 kilometres (20 miles in length) is located in the east of the Indre Wijdefjorden National Park.

References

Fjords of Spitsbergen